The Bureau of Meteorology (BOM or BoM) is an executive agency of the Australian Government responsible for providing weather services to Australia and surrounding areas. It was established in 1906 under the Meteorology Act, and brought together the state meteorological services that existed before then. The states officially transferred their weather recording responsibilities to the Bureau of Meteorology on 1 January 1908.

History
The Bureau of Meteorology was established on 1 January 1908 following the passage of the Meteorology Act 1906. Prior to Federation in 1901, each colony had had its own meteorological service, with all but two colonies also having a subsection devoted to astronomy. In August 1905, federal home affairs minister Littleton Groom surveyed state governments for their willingness to cede control, finding South Australia and Victoria unwilling. However, at a ministerial conference in April 1906 the state governments agreed to transfer responsibility for meteorology and astronomy to the federal government. Groom rejected a takeover of astronomy due to its connection to universities, which relied on state legislation for their authority.

Henry Ambrose Hunt was appointed as the first Commonwealth Meteorologist in November 1906. Initially the bureau had few staff and issued a single daily forecast for each state, transmitted by Morse code to country areas. Radio forecasts were introduced in 1924. The bureau received additional funding from the late 1930s, in the lead-up to World War II, and it was incorporated into the Royal Australian Air Force (RAAF) from 1941 until after the conclusion of the war. It became an inaugural member of the World Meteorological Organization (WMO) in 1950. Televised weather forecasts were introduced in 1956.

The 1906 act governing the bureau was repealed and replaced by the Meteorology Act 1955, which brought its functions in line with the expectations of the WMO and allowed for a significant reorganisation of its structure. At this time the bureau came under the Department of the Interior. In 1957, partly as a response to the 1955 Hunter Valley floods, the bureau added a hydrometeorological service. In 1964, the federal government agreed to establish one of the three World Meteorological Centres in Melbourne, as part of the WMO's World Weather Watch scheme.

In October 2022, the bureau asked media organizations to update their style guides so that they were no longer referred to as "BOM" or the "Weather Bureau". The decision was reversed that week.

Services and structure

The Bureau of Meteorology is the main provider of weather forecasts, warnings and observations to the Australian public. The bureau distributes weather images via radiofax and is responsible for issuing flood alerts in Australia.

The bureau's head office is in Melbourne Docklands, which includes the Bureau's Research Centre, the Bureau National Operations Centre, the National Climate Centre, the Victorian Regional Forecasting Centre as well as the Hydrology and Satellite sections.

Regional offices are located in each state and territory capital. Each regional office includes a regional forecasting centre (RFC) and a flood warning centre. The Adelaide office incorporates the National Tidal Centre, while the Darwin office the Volcanic Ash Advisory Centre and Regional Specialised Meteorological Centre (Analysis). The Perth, Darwin and Brisbane offices also housed Tropical Cyclone Warning Centres which were ultimately unified into one since the 2020–21 cyclone season.

The Australian Bureau of Meteorology issues Tropical Cyclone advisories and developed the Standard Emergency Warning Signal used for warnings. The bureau is responsible for tropical cyclone naming for storms in waters surrounding Australia. Three lists of names used to be maintained, one for each of the western, northern and eastern Australian regions. However, as of the start of the 2008–09 Tropical Cyclone Year these lists have been rolled into one main national list of tropical cyclone names.

The regional offices are supported by the Bureau National Operations Centre (BNOC) which is also located at the head office in Melbourne Docklands.

The Bureau maintains a network of field offices across the continent, on neighbouring islands and in Antarctica. There is also a network of some 500 paid co-operative observers and approximately 6,000 voluntary rainfall observers.

The Bureau of Meteorology has been accused of being influenced by oil and gas giants such as Santos, Chevron and Woodside to downplay the effects of climate change to please their leaders. Sentences in the Bureau's report on the 2019–20 Australian bushfire season were censored and/or modified to remove references to climate change and long-term warming trends.

Directors
The following people have been directors of the Bureau of Meteorology:

Technology

In the head office a Cray XC40 supercomputer called "Australis" provides the operational computing capability for weather, climate, ocean and wave numerical prediction and simulation, while other Unix servers support the computer message switching system and real-time data base. The Australian Integrated Forecast System affords the main computing infrastructure in the regional offices.
Numerical weather prediction is performed using the Unified Model software. The Bureau of Meteorology announced the Cray contract in July 2015, commissioned the Cray XC40 supercomputer on 30 June 2016 and decommissioned their Oracle HPC system in October 2016.

See also
World Meteorological Organization, co-ordination body for weather, climate and environment services
International Cloud Experiment, which collected data on tropical cyclones in January and February 2006
[[{{#ifexpr:>6|–|–}} Australian region cyclone season]]
Water Data Transfer Format
Australasian Fire and Emergency Service Authorities Council

References

External links

Bureau of Meteorology main page
Federation and Meteorology: the history of meteorology in Australia

 
Climate of Australia
Commonwealth Government agencies of Australia
Governmental meteorological agencies in Oceania
Regional Specialized Meteorological Centres
1908 establishments in Australia